Asymbolus funebris, or blotched catshark, is a catshark of the family Scyliorhinidae, the only specimen, the holotype, being found off Western Australia at 144 m.  Its length is 44 cm and its reproduction is oviparous.

See also
Scyliorhinus meadi, also known as the blotched catshark

References

blotched catshark
Marine fish of Southern Australia
blotched catshark